Luis Joaquín Miró-Quesada de la Guerra (1880–1976) was a Peruvian journalist and politician in the early 20th century. He was the mayor of Lima from 1916 to 1918, Minister of Foreign Affairs (1931) and director of El Comercio.

He studied at Universidad Mayor de San Marcos.

Mayors of Lima
Peruvian people of Catalan descent
1880 births
1976 deaths